Chlamyphorinae is a subfamily of South American armadillos in the family Chlamyphoridae. Members of this subfamily, the fairy armadillos, are largely fossorial and have reduced eyes and robust forearms with large claws for digging.



Taxonomy
The subfamily has two monotypic genera:
Calyptophractus, greater fairy armadillo
Chlamyphorus, pink fairy armadillo

Phylogeny
Chlamyphorinae is the sister group of Tolypeutinae (giant, three-banded and naked-tailed armadillos), as shown below.

References

Armadillos
Mammal subfamilies
Taxa named by Charles Lucien Bonaparte